Qaqulluit (Inuktitut syllabics: ᖃᖁᓪᓗᐃᑦ formerly Qaqaluit Island (meaning: "northern fulmar") is one of eastern Baffin Island's small, offshore, uninhabited islands, located in the Arctic Archipelago in the Qikiqtaaluk Region, Nunavut. Along with Paallavvik and Aggijjat, it is situated off Cumberland Peninsula within Davis Strait's Merchants Bay.

Geography
Its characteristics include coastal cliffs and rocky shores.

Fauna
Harp seal, polar bear, and walrus frequent the area.

Conservation
The newly created Qaqulluit National Wildlife Area extends beyond the island to also include the Reid Bay Important Bird Area on Baffin Island.

Located on the island's northeastern tip, Nuvuttiq is another a Canadian Important Bird Area, an International Biological Program site and a Key Terrestrial Bird Habitat site.

References 

Islands of Davis Strait
Uninhabited islands of Qikiqtaaluk Region
Islands of Baffin Island
Nature conservation in Nunavut